The women's team compound competition at the 2003 World Archery Championships took place in July 2003 in New York City, United States. 69 archers took part in the women's compound qualification round with no more than 4 from each country. As there were only 15 eligible teams of 3 archers, all teams qualified for the 4-round knockout round, drawn according to their qualification round scores, with the top-ranked team given a bye to the quarter final.

Seeds
Seedings were based on the combined total of the team members' qualification scores in the individual ranking rounds. The top 16 teams were assigned places in the draw depending on their overall ranking.

Draw

References

2003 World Archery Championships
World